Henry Garrett may refer to:

* Henry Garrett (psychologist) (1894–1973), American psychologist and segregationist
 Henry Garrett (politician), mayor of Corpus Christi, Texas
 Henry Garrett (actor), English actor
 Henry Beresford Garrett (1818–1885), New Zealand cooper and criminal
 Henry L. Garrett III (born 1939), U.S. Secretary of the Navy
 Hank Garrett (born 1931), American actor and comedian